Stenton, also known as the James Logan Home, was the country home of James Logan, colonial Mayor of Philadelphia and Chief Justice of the Pennsylvania Supreme Court. The home is located at 4601 North 18th Street in the Logan neighborhood of North Philadelphia.

History
Arriving in Philadelphia in 1699 as William Penn's secretary, Logan occupied pivotal roles in the colony's government—including that of chief justice of the Supreme Court and acting governor—for 50 years. He assembled one of the best libraries in colonial America, discovered the vital role of pollen in the fertilization of corn (an achievement that caused Linnaeus to consider him "among the demigods of science"), and amassed a fortune in the fur trade.

The building is of red brick, with dark headers. The roof atop its 2 stories is hipped.

After James Logan's death in 1751, Stenton was inherited by his son, William Logan (1717–1776). William used Stenton mainly as a summer residence, choosing to live in Philadelphia for the rest of the year. He also built the kitchen and added many fine furnishings.

After William's death in 1776, Stenton was in turn inherited by his son, Dr. George Logan (1753–1821), a physician and later US senator. The house figured in the 1777 Battle of Germantown, and served as headquarters of both General George Washington and British General Lord William Howe. George married Deborah Norris (1761–1839), a noted diarist and historian, and the person to whom Sally Wister's Journal was written, in 1781. The mansion remained in the hands of the Logan family until 1910, when it was acquired by the City of Philadelphia.

Museum
Stenton, now open as a historic house museum, part of the Historic Germantown Historic Society is an outstanding example of early American Georgian architecture. Stenton was designated a National Historic Landmark on January 12, 1965. The mansion lends its name to nearby Stenton Park and Stenton Avenue. The village of Stanton in Readington Township, New Jersey also borrows its name from the mansion.

In Popular Culture
Summer 1999 director Andrew Repasky McElhinney shot interiors at Stenton for his second feature as a writer/director, the period art-horror film, A Chronicle of Corpses, starring Marj Dusay, Kevin Mitchel Martin, Oliver Wyman, David Semonin, Margot White and Ryan Foley. A Chronicle of Corpses was praised by Dave Kehr of The New York Times as belonging "to the small but significant tradition of outsider art in American movies - films like Herk Harvey's Carnival of Souls or George Romero's Night of the Living Dead - that reflect powerful personalities formed outside any academic or professional tradition.”  The original camera negative of A Chronicle of Corpses is in the permanent collection of MoMA - The Museum of Modern Art (New York)  along with other movies directed by McElhinney.

See also

 List of Washington's Headquarters during the Revolutionary War
 Wyck House
 List of National Historic Landmarks in Philadelphia
 National Register of Historic Places listings in North Philadelphia

References

Further reading

External links

Engraved image of Stenton
Listing and images at Philadelphia Architects and Buildings
Information at FieldTrip.com
Article at La Salle University
Listing at USHistory.org

Historic American Buildings Survey in Philadelphia
Historic American Landscapes Survey in Pennsylvania
Historic house museums in Philadelphia
Houses on the National Register of Historic Places in Philadelphia
National Historic Landmarks in Pennsylvania
Houses completed in 1730
American Revolutionary War museums in Pennsylvania
Logan, Philadelphia
National Society of the Colonial Dames of America